The Inner Mongolian independence movement, also known as the Southern Mongolian independence movement, is a movement for the independence of Inner Mongolia (also known as Southern Mongolia) and the political separation of Inner Mongolia from the People's Republic of China. It is principally led by the Mongolian diaspora in countries like Japan and the United States, and in some European countries.

The movement is led primarily by three popular organizations: the Inner Mongolian People's Party, a member of the Unrepresented Nations and Peoples Organization; the Southern Mongolian Democratic Alliance, and the Mongolian Liberal Union Party, led by Temtsiltu Shobtsood (Xi Haiming), the Southern Mongolian Democratic Alliance, led by Hada; and the Mongolian Liberal Union Party, led by Olhunud Daichin. The stated goals of all three organizations are the secession of Inner Mongolia from the People's Republic of China, and either the establishment of an independent Inner Mongolian state or the unification of Inner Mongolia with "Outer Mongolia", i.e. the State of Mongolia. The Chinese government asserts that there is active Inner Mongolian separatism, and the 2020 Inner Mongolia protests and a few other specific examples have been noted. In 2018, Chinese media reported that a man surnamed Jiang was the first in Inner Mongolia to be sentenced on charges of terrorism in the region, although it was not specified what cause he was supporting.

See also

Pan-Mongolism
List of active separatist movements in Asia
Secession in China
Separatist movements of China
Affirmative action in China
Human rights of ethnic minorities in China

References

 
History of Mongolia
Irredentism
Mongolian nationalism
Nationalist movements in Asia